Stuart Flinn (born: 24 August 1964) is a Canadian sailor from Halifax, Nova Scotia. who represented his country at the 1988 Summer Olympics in Busan, South Korea as crew member in the Soling. With helmsman Paul Thomson and fellow crew members Philip Gow they took the 12th place. The same team competed in the 1992 Summer Olympics in Barcelona, Spain were they took the 7th place.

References

1964 births
Living people
Canadian male sailors (sport)
Olympic sailors of Canada
Sailors at the 1988 Summer Olympics – Soling
Sailors at the 1992 Summer Olympics – Soling
Sportspeople from Halifax, Nova Scotia